The 2014 Women's Rugby World Cup was the seventh edition of the Women's Rugby World Cup, and the sixth held in Europe. The World Cup Final took place on 17 August.

All of the pool games for the World Cup took place at the Centre National du Rugby (CNR) in Marcoussis and Marcoussis Rugby Club with the French union adopting the concept of restricting the tournament to one or two locations as in the 2010 Women's Rugby World Cup in London.  Marcoussis is about 20 miles south of Paris.

The knockout stages of the tournament also saw matches played at the CNR in Marcoussis, with the semi-finals, Bronze Final and Final taking place at Stade Jean-Bouin in the French capital – home of Stade Français.

The matches took place on 1, 5, 9, and 13 August with the final played on 17 August.

The tournament format was the same as in 2010, with 12 teams split into three pools of four. The pool allocation draw took place once all 12 teams were confirmed.

England won the final 21-9 against Canada on 17 August.

Bidding process
On 27 August 2009 the International Rugby Board (IRB; now known as World Rugby) announced that it was inviting bids to host the 2014 event. Unions had until 30 October 2009 to express an interest with the chosen host being announced on 12 May 2010. The announcement was an important development in the history of women's rugby as the IRB had never previously announced a competition to host a Women's World Cup with such publicity, nor so far ahead of the event. The chosen hosts for 2014 would also have had four years to prepare – twice as long as any previous host. The announcement was also significant because, for the first time, the IRB included the "unofficial" 1991 and 1994 World Cups in their official list of previous tournaments.

On 21 December 2009, the IRB announced the four nations that formally applied to host the 2014 Women's Rugby World Cup:
Kazakhstan
New Zealand (bid subsequently withdrawn, in favour of Samoa)
Samoa
United States

However, after delaying the announcement until September 2010, the IRB eventually announced that, due to problems with the existing bids, they were reopening applications. Then, on 30 June 2011 the  IRB announced that the tournament would be held in France.

Qualifying

France, as the host nation, qualified automatically. The top three teams from the 2010 tournament, New Zealand, England, and Australia, also qualified automatically. Canada and the United States qualified due to there being no interest from other North or South American unions.

Qualified teams

Match officials
In April 2014 the IRB announced a panel of 14 match officials for the tournament, including eight referees and six assistant. New Zealand provided two of the referees in the form of Jess Beard and Nicky Inwood, while there will be one each from United States, England, South Africa, Ireland, Australia and Canada. England provided  two assistant referees with the others coming from Italy, France, Scotland and Spain. Nicky Inwood, Sherry Trumbull and Clare Daniels were selected for 2010 Women's Rugby World Cup, which took place in England. Indeed, Inwood and Daniels also refereed at the 2006 edition in Canada.

In August 2014, it was announced that Australian referee Amy Perrett would adjudicate the final.

Referees (8)
  Jess Beard
  Leah Berard
  Claire Hodnett
  Nicky Inwood
  Marlize Jordaan
  Helen O'Reilly
  Amy Perrett
  Sherry Trumbull

Assistant referees (6)
  Beatrice Benvenuti
  Sara Cox
  Clare Daniels
  Marie Lematte
  Alhambra Nievas
  Alex Pratt

Squads

Pool stage

The pool draw took place on 30 October 2013 at Hotel de Ville, Paris. The twelve qualified teams were organised into four bands:

Band 1: New Zealand, England, Australia 
Band 2: Canada, USA, France 
Band 3: Ireland, Wales, Spain 
Band 4: Kazakhstan, Samoa, South Africa

Each pool was a single round-robin of six games, in which each team played one match against each of the other teams in the same pool. Teams were awarded four points for a win, two points for a draw and none for a defeat of more than seven points. A team scoring four or more tries in one match earned a bonus point, as did teams that lost by seven points or fewer.

Pool A

Pool B

Pool C

Finals

Knockout rankings
At the completion of the pool stage, teams were ranked first according to their position within their pool and then by competition points. The top four teams progressed to the tournament semi-finals, teams ranked 5–8 progressed to the 5th to 8th play-offs, and the teams ranked 9–12 progressed to the 9th to 12th play-offs.

Tie Breakers
Ties on competition points were broken in the following order:
1. Winner of the match between the two teams (does not apply to teams in different pools); 
2. Difference between points scored and points conceded;
3. Difference between tries scored and tries conceded;
4. Most points scored;
5. Most tries scored;
6. Coin toss.

Rankings Play-offs 9 to 12

Semi-finals

11th Place Playoff

9th Place Playoff

Rankings Play-offs 5 to 8

Semi-finals

7th Place Playoff

5th Place Playoff

Semi-finals and final

Semi-finals

3rd Place Playoff

Final

Statistics

Points scorers

Try scorers

Discipline
1 Red Card 
 Soteria Pulumu (5-match suspension)

Suspension Following Citing
 Rebecca de Filippo (2-week suspension) in match against New Zealand
 Mandisa Williams (16-week suspension) in match against Australia

2 Yellow Cards  
 Celeste Adonis
 Oxana Shadrina
 Rachel Taylor
 Shona-Leah Weston

1 Yellow Card 

 Chloe Buttler
 Helen Collins
 Jenny Davies
 Olivia DeMerchant
 Linda Itunu
 Natalya Kamendrovskaya
 Mary Jane Kirby
 Caroline Ladagnous
 Rita Lilii
 Michelle Milward
 Taliilagi Mefi
 Claire Molloy
 Marlie Packer
 Shannon Parry
 Rebecca Smyth
 Shaina Turley
 Sarah Walsh
 Brittany Waters

See also
Women's Rugby World Cup
Rugby World Cup
Rugby World Cup Sevens

References

External links

 
2014
2014 rugby union tournaments for national teams
International women's rugby union competitions hosted by France
2014–15 in French rugby union
2014 in French women's sport
2014 in women's rugby union
August 2014 sports events in Europe